The Ministry of Community Development and Social Services is a ministry in Zambia. It is headed by the Minister of Community Development and Social Services.

List of ministers

Deputy ministers

References

External links
Official website

Local government